Alison Armitage  (born February 26, 1965) is a former swimmer, actress and Playboy Playmate.

Early life
Armitage was born in High Wycombe, London, but grew up in Hong Kong where she lived for 20 years. She is of mixed German, French, and English descent. Armitage has been a swimmer since the age of four, and qualified for the Hong Kong Olympic team. However, she abandoned the sport during her teens. Armitage studied at Island School in Hong Kong before studying computer science at the University of San Diego in California. She eventually started a career as a model.

Playboy Playmate and modeling career 

Under the pseudonym Brittany York, Armitage was Playboys Playmate of the Month for October 1990. As a result, she appeared in many Playboy videos and promotions. Armitage also appeared in a pictorial in Maxim magazine in 1999. Aside from that, she also appeared in the cover of other magazines like Razor, DT, and Bikini. Armitage was also featured in TV commercials for brands like Reebok Sportswear, West cigarettes, Budweiser, Trac mobile phones, among others.

Acting career
Armitage started her acting career in the early 1990s with small roles on the TV show Full House and the film Miracle Beach. After that, she landed a leading role in the television series Acapulco H.E.A.T. from 1993 to 1994 and from 1996 to 1997. Armitage also appeared in popular TV shows like Seinfeld and the long-running soap opera The Bold and the Beautiful. She also had bit parts in movies such as Jerry Maguire and Driven.

Filmography

Film

Television

References

People educated at Island School
University of San Diego alumni
Hong Kong female swimmers
1990s Playboy Playmates
Hong Kong people of German descent
Hong Kong people of English descent
Hong Kong people of French descent
Actresses from Buckinghamshire
People from High Wycombe
1965 births
Living people
20th-century English women
20th-century English people